Calamus caryotoides (also Palmijuncus caryotoides), more commonly known as fishtail lawyer cane is a North-East Queensland tropical forest climbing palm with very thin flexible trunks; no crownshaft; small spikes;  dark green, glossy, fish-tail shaped leaves reaching up to  high ( spread); and very thin hooked flagella.

It tends to clump and grow up into the shaded understory of Queensland's wet tropical forests, and is a close relative of the more infamous Calamus radicalis (aka Wait-a-While).

The Cairns Botanical Gardens records local Yidinydji, Yirrganyydji, Djabuganydji, and Gungganydji use Calamus caryotoides (also known to Yidinydji as Bugul, pronounced BOOK-KOOL) as follows:

The thin flexible trunks of this (and other) climbing palm made ideal building frames, or rope and string when split. The young shoots were eaten to cure headaches.

References

caryotoides
Plants described in 1853
Endemic flora of Queensland
Taxa named by Carl Friedrich Philipp von Martius